Rooster 101 (101.9 FM) is a radio station in the Cayman Islands in the British West Indies. The station is owned by Compass Media. It airs a country music format. Compass Media was founded in 1965. 

It began broadcasting as ZFKY, issued under the British call sign system. The station's current license was issued on 11 December 2003.

Translators

References

External links
Rooster 101 official website

Radio stations in the Cayman Islands
Radio stations established in 2002
2002 establishments in the Cayman Islands